De Held is a 2016 Dutch crime film directed by Menno Meyjes. It was based on the novel of the same name by Jessica Durlacher. It was listed as one of eleven films that could be selected as the Dutch submission for the Best Foreign Language Film at the 89th Academy Awards, but it was not nominated.

Cast
 Fedja van Huêt as Jacob
 Daan Schuurmans as Anton
 Monic Hendrickx as Sara
 Kitty Courbois as Iezebel
 Susan Visser as Judith

References

External links
 

2016 films
2016 crime films
Dutch crime films
2010s Dutch-language films